Colonel Thomas George Greenwell, TD, DL (18 December 1894 – 15 November 1967) was a British politician. He was the National Conservative Member of Parliament (MP) for The Hartlepools and the managing director of the ship-repair yard, T. W. Greenwell and Co. Ltd, a Sunderland yard which had been founded by his father in 1901.

Greenwell was educated at Gresham's School, Holt, and at King's College, Newcastle.

The by-election he won in 1943 was held according to the convention of the war years - neither the Labour Party nor the Liberal Party put up a candidate, to give the incumbent party a clear run, although an independent, a Common Wealth Party candidate and a Progressive Socialist stood. The 'swing' to the Conservatives was the largest in any by-election in the war years, largely because of Greenwell's strongly pro-Churchillian stance. Surprisingly, the post-war 1945 general election only just removed him — there was a recount. In 1951 he was appointed High Sheriff of Durham.

He was also a Justice of the Peace and Deputy Lieutenant for County Durham. In Who's Who he gave his recreation as salmon fishing. He was a member of the Carlton Club.

His daughter, Pamela Hunter, later followed him into politics, and was chair of the Conservative Party Conference in the year of the Brighton bombing (she was subsequently made a Dame of the Order of the British Empire).

Sources

External links 
 billgreenwell.com
 

1894 births
1967 deaths
Politics of the Borough of Hartlepool
Conservative Party (UK) MPs for English constituencies
UK MPs 1935–1945
High Sheriffs of Durham
People educated at Gresham's School
Deputy Lieutenants of Durham